Billy Scannell (born 16 September 1999) is an Irish rugby union player. He plays as a hooker.

Early life
Born in Cork, Scannell is the younger brother of Munster players Niall and Rory and a cousin of Jack O'Sullivan. His grandfather is Donal O'Sullivan, who captained Cork to the 1956 All-Ireland Senior Football Championship Final. Scannell first began playing rugby for Douglas RFC, but switched to Cork Constitution at under-12 level, where his older brothers were already on the books. He attended Presentation Brothers College, Cork and won a Munster Schools Rugby Senior Cup in 2017, in a side that was captained by his cousin Jack. Scannell also captained the school's senior side, and started for Ireland under-18s in all three of their tests against Italy, England and Wales.

Club career
After finishing school in 2018, Scannell entered Munster's sub-academy and began playing in the amateur All-Ireland League with Limerick club Young Munster.

Scannell was overlooked for promotion to Munster's academy, so instead, at the age of 19, he signed a two-year academy contract with French club Biarritz ahead of the 2019–20 season. The deal meant that Scannell would train full-time with the club's senior squad, whilst initially playing matches for the espoirs, or under-23s, side. He made his senior competitive debut for the club in their 2019–20 Pro D2 round 20 fixture away to Vannes on 14 February 2020. Scannell joined Fédérale 1 club Stade Lagonnais on loan for the 2021–22 season.

International career
Having previously represented Ireland at under-18 and under-19 level, Scannell made his debut for Ireland under-20s in their 34–14 win against Italy on 22 February 2019 during the 2019 Six Nations Under 20s Championship. Ireland went on to win a grand slam in that year's tournament.

References

External links
It's Rugby.co.uk Profile
ESPNScrum Profile

Living people
1999 births
People educated at Presentation Brothers College, Cork
Rugby union players from County Cork
Irish rugby union players
Young Munster players
Cork Constitution players
Biarritz Olympique players
Irish expatriate rugby union players
Rugby union hookers